Nocardioides islandensis is a bacterium from the genus Nocardioides which has been isolated from farming field soil from Bigeum Island, Korea.

References

External links
Type strain of Nocardioides islandensis at BacDive -  the Bacterial Diversity Metadatabase	

islandensis
Bacteria described in 2009